Paul William Matthews (born 30 September 1946) is an English former professional footballer who played in the Football League for Leicester City, Mansfield Town, Northampton Town, Rotherham United and Southend United.

References

1946 births
Living people
English footballers
Association football midfielders
English Football League players
Leicester City F.C. players
Southend United F.C. players
Rotherham United F.C. players
Northampton Town F.C. players
Mansfield Town F.C. players
Leicester United F.C. players
Heanor Town F.C. players
Oadby Town F.C. players